Acrolophus texanella (grass tubeworm or Texas grass tubeworm moth) is a moth of the family Acrolophidae. It is found from Maryland to Florida and to Texas.

The wingspan is about 20 mm.

References

Moths described in 1878
texanella